The year 1941 in archaeology involved some significant events.

Explorations
 First Gujarat prehistoric expedition (continues to 1942).

Excavations
 June 19 - Mikhail M. Gerasimov opens Tamerlane's tomb.
 Excavations at Olmec site of La Venta by Matthew Stirling begin.
 Excavations at Arikamedu (Podouké) by the Société de l'histoire de l'Inde française begin (continue to 1945).
 Excavations at Baiae, Italy, begin.
 Excavations at Fulda.

Publications
 Father Alberto Maria de Agostini becomes the first to write about Cueva de las Manos.

Finds
 September - Remains of Roman villa at Brantingham in the East Riding of Yorkshire, England.

Awards

Miscellaneous
 September 27 - A Vichy France law promulgated by Jérôme Carcopino makes buried archaeological relics state property.
 The bulk of the finds from the 1927-1937 excavations of Peking Man Site in Zhoukoudian, China are lost, never to be recovered, while being transported to safety.

Births
 July 8: Martin Carver, English archaeologist of early medieval Britain
 August 5: Ina Plug, née Post, Dutch-born zooarchaeologist
 December 16: Kent R. Weeks, American Egyptologist

Deaths
 July 11: Arthur Evans, English archaeologist of Minoan civilisation

References

Archaeology
Archaeology
Archaeology by year